Technetium (43Tc) is one of the two elements with  that have no stable isotopes; the other such element is promethium. It is primarily artificial, with only trace quantities existing in nature produced by spontaneous fission (there are an estimated  grams of 99Tc per gram of pitchblende) or neutron capture by molybdenum. The first isotopes to be synthesized were 97Tc and 99Tc in 1936, the first artificial element to be produced. The most stable radioisotopes are 97Tc (half-life of 4.21 million years), 98Tc (half-life: 4.2 million years), and 99Tc (half-life: 211,100 years).

Thirty-three other radioisotopes have been characterized with atomic masses ranging from 85Tc to 120Tc. Most of these have half-lives that are less than an hour; the exceptions are 93Tc (half-life: 2.75 hours), 94Tc (half-life: 4.883 hours), 95Tc (half-life: 20 hours), and 96Tc (half-life: 4.28 days).

Technetium also has numerous meta states. 97mTc is the most stable, with a half-life of 91.0 days (0.097 MeV). This is followed by 95mTc (half-life: 61 days, 0.038 MeV) and 99mTc (half-life: 6.04 hours, 0.143 MeV). 99mTc only emits gamma rays, subsequently decaying to 99Tc.

For isotopes lighter than 98Tc, the primary decay mode is electron capture to isotopes of molybdenum. For the heavier isotopes, the primary mode is beta emission to isotopes of ruthenium, with the exception that 100Tc can decay both by beta emission and electron capture.

Technetium-99m is the hallmark technetium isotope employed in the nuclear medicine industry. Its low-energy isomeric transition, which yields a gamma-ray at ~140.5 keV, is ideal for imaging using Single Photon Emission Computed Tomography (SPECT).  Several technetium isotopes, such as 94mTc, 95gTc, and 96gTc, which are produced via (p,n) reactions using a cyclotron on molybdenum targets, have also been identified as potential Positron Emission Tomography (PET) agents. Technetium-101 has been produced using a D-D fusion-based neutron generator from the 100Mo(n,γ)101Mo reaction on natural molybdenum and subsequent beta-minus decay of 101Mo to 101Tc. Despite its shorter-half life (i.e., 14.22 min), 101Tc exhibits unique decay characteristics suitable for radioisotope diagnostic or therapeutic procedures, where it has been proposed that its implementation, as a supplement for dual-isotopic imaging or replacement for  99mTc, could be performed by on-site production and dispensing at the point of patient care.

Technetium-99 is the most common and most readily available isotope, as it is a major fission product from fission of actinides like uranium and plutonium with a fission product yield of 6% or more, and in fact the most significant long-lived fission product. Lighter isotopes of technetium are almost never produced in fission because the initial fission products normally have a higher neutron/proton ratio than is stable for their mass range, and therefore undergo beta decay until reaching the ultimate product. Beta decay of fission products of mass 95–98 stops at the stable isotopes of molybdenum of those masses and does not reach technetium. For mass 100 and greater, the technetium isotopes of those masses are very short-lived and quickly beta decay to isotopes of ruthenium. Therefore, the technetium in spent nuclear fuel is practically all 99Tc. In the presence of fast neutrons a small amount of  will be produced by (n,2n) "knockout" reactions. If nuclear transmutation of fission-derived Technetium or Technetium waste from medical applications is desired, fast neutrons are therefore not desirable as the long lived  increases rather than reducing the longevity of the radioactivity in the material.

One gram of 99Tc produces  disintegrations a second (that is, 0.62 GBq/g).

Technetium has no stable or nearly stable isotopes, and thus a standard atomic weight cannot be given.

List of isotopes

|-
| rowspan=3|85Tc
| rowspan=3 style="text-align:right" | 43
| rowspan=3 style="text-align:right" | 42
| rowspan=3|84.94883(43)#
| rowspan=3|<110 ns
| β+
| 85Mo
| rowspan=3|1/2−#
| rowspan=3 |
|-
| p
| 84Mo
|-
| β+, p
| 84Nb
|-
| 86Tc
| style="text-align:right" | 43
| style="text-align:right" | 43
| 85.94288(32)#
| 55(6) ms
| β+
| 86Mo
| (0+)
|
|-
| style="text-indent:1em" | 86mTc
| colspan="3" style="text-indent:2em" | 1500(150) keV
| 1.11(21) µs
|
|
| (5+, 5−)
|
|-
| 87Tc
| style="text-align:right" | 43
| style="text-align:right" | 44
| 86.93653(32)#
| 2.18(16) s
| β+
| 87Mo
| 1/2−#
|
|-
| style="text-indent:1em" | 87mTc
| colspan="3" style="text-indent:2em" | 20(60)# keV
| 2# s
|
|
| 9/2+#
|
|-
| 88Tc
| style="text-align:right" | 43
| style="text-align:right" | 45
| 87.93268(22)#
| 5.8(2) s
| β+
| 88Mo
| (2, 3)
|
|-
| style="text-indent:1em" | 88mTc
| colspan="3" style="text-indent:2em" | 0(300)# keV
| 6.4(8) s
| β+
| 88Mo
| (6, 7, 8)
|
|-
| 89Tc
| style="text-align:right" | 43
| style="text-align:right" | 46
| 88.92717(22)#
| 12.8(9) s
| β+
| 89Mo
| (9/2+)
|
|-
| style="text-indent:1em" | 89mTc
| colspan="3" style="text-indent:2em" | 62.6(5) keV
| 12.9(8) s
| β+
| 89Mo
| (1/2−)
|
|-
| 90Tc
| style="text-align:right" | 43
| style="text-align:right" | 47
| 89.92356(26)
| 8.7(2) s
| β+
| 90Mo
| 1+
|
|-
| style="text-indent:1em" | 90mTc
| colspan="3" style="text-indent:2em" | 310(390) keV
| 49.2(4) s
| β+
| 90Mo
| (8+)
|
|-
| 91Tc
| style="text-align:right" | 43
| style="text-align:right" | 48
| 90.91843(22)
| 3.14(2) min
| β+
| 91Mo
| (9/2)+
|
|-
| rowspan=2 style="text-indent:1em" | 91mTc
| rowspan=2 colspan="3" style="text-indent:2em" | 139.3(3) keV
| rowspan=2|3.3(1) min
| β+ (99%)
| 91Mo
| rowspan=2|(1/2)−
| rowspan=2|
|-
| IT (1%)
| 91Tc
|-
| 92Tc
| style="text-align:right" | 43
| style="text-align:right" | 49
| 91.915260(28)
| 4.25(15) min
| β+
| 92Mo
| (8)+
|
|-
| style="text-indent:1em" | 92mTc
| colspan="3" style="text-indent:2em" | 270.15(11) keV
| 1.03(7) µs
|
|
| (4+)
|
|-
| 93Tc
| style="text-align:right" | 43
| style="text-align:right" | 50
| 92.910249(4)
| 2.75(5) h
| β+
| 93Mo
| 9/2+
|
|-
| rowspan=2 style="text-indent:1em" | 93m1Tc
| rowspan=2 colspan="3" style="text-indent:2em" | 391.84(8) keV
| rowspan=2|43.5(10) min
| IT (76.6%)
| 93Tc
| rowspan=2|1/2−
| rowspan=2|
|-
| β+ (23.4%)
| 93Mo
|-
| style="text-indent:1em" | 93m2Tc
| colspan="3" style="text-indent:2em" | 2185.16(15) keV
| 10.2(3) µs
|
|
| (17/2)−
|
|-
| 94Tc
| style="text-align:right" | 43
| style="text-align:right" | 51
| 93.909657(5)
| 293(1) min
| β+
| 94Mo
| 7+
|
|-
| rowspan=2 style="text-indent:1em" | 94mTc
| rowspan=2 colspan="3" style="text-indent:2em" | 75.5(19) keV
| rowspan=2|52.0(10) min
| β+ (99.9%)
| 94Mo
| rowspan=2|(2)+
| rowspan=2|
|-
| IT (.1%)
| 94Tc
|-
| 95Tc
| style="text-align:right" | 43
| style="text-align:right" | 52
| 94.907657(6)
| 20.0(1) h
| β+
| 95Mo
| 9/2+
|
|-
| rowspan=2 style="text-indent:1em" | 95mTc
| rowspan=2 colspan="3" style="text-indent:2em" | 38.89(5) keV
| rowspan=2|61(2) d
| β+ (96.12%)
| 95Mo
| rowspan=2|1/2−
| rowspan=2|
|-
| IT (3.88%)
| 95Tc
|-
| 96Tc
| style="text-align:right" | 43
| style="text-align:right" | 53
| 95.907871(6)
| 4.28(7) d
| β+
| 96Mo
| 7+
|
|-
| rowspan=2 style="text-indent:1em" | 96mTc
| rowspan=2 colspan="3" style="text-indent:2em" | 34.28(7) keV
| rowspan=2|51.5(10) min
| IT (98%)
| 96Tc
| rowspan=2|4+
| rowspan=2|
|-
| β+ (2%)
| 96Mo
|-
| 97Tc
| style="text-align:right" | 43
| style="text-align:right" | 54
| 96.906365(5)
| 4.21×106 y
| EC
| 97Mo
| 9/2+
|
|-
| rowspan=2 style="text-indent:1em" | 97mTc
| rowspan=2 colspan="3" style="text-indent:2em" | 96.56(6) keV
| rowspan=2|91.0(6) d
| IT (99.66%)
| 97Tc
| rowspan=2|1/2−
| rowspan=2|
|-
| EC (.34%)
| 97Mo
|-
| 98Tc
| style="text-align:right" | 43
| style="text-align:right" | 55
| 97.907216(4)
| 4.2×106 y
| β−
| 98Ru
| (6)+
|
|-
| style="text-indent:1em" | 98mTc
| colspan="3" style="text-indent:2em" | 90.76(16) keV
| 14.7(3) µs
|
|
| (2)−
|
|-
| 99Tc
| style="text-align:right" | 43
| style="text-align:right" | 56
| 98.9062547(21)
| 2.111(12)×105 y
| β−
| 99Ru
| 9/2+
| trace
|-
| rowspan=2 style="text-indent:1em" | 99mTc
| rowspan=2 colspan="3" style="text-indent:2em" | 142.6832(11) keV
| rowspan=2|6.0067(5) h
| IT (99.99%)
| 99Tc
| rowspan=2|1/2−
| rowspan=2|
|-
| β− (.0037%)
| 99Ru
|-
| rowspan=2|100Tc
| rowspan=2 style="text-align:right" | 43
| rowspan=2 style="text-align:right" | 57
| rowspan=2|99.9076578(24)
| rowspan=2|15.8(1) s
| β− (99.99%)
| 100Ru
| rowspan=2|1+
| rowspan=2|
|-
| EC (.0018%)
| 100Mo
|-
| style="text-indent:1em" | 100m1Tc
| colspan="3" style="text-indent:2em" | 200.67(4) keV
| 8.32(14) µs
|
|
| (4)+
|
|-
| style="text-indent:1em" | 100m2Tc
| colspan="3" style="text-indent:2em" | 243.96(4) keV
| 3.2(2) µs
|
|
| (6)+
|
|-
| 101Tc
| style="text-align:right" | 43
| style="text-align:right" | 58
| 100.907315(26)
| 14.22(1) min
| β−
| 101Ru
| 9/2+
|
|-
| style="text-indent:1em" | 101mTc
| colspan="3" style="text-indent:2em" | 207.53(4) keV
| 636(8) µs
|
|
| 1/2−
|
|-
| 102Tc
| style="text-align:right" | 43
| style="text-align:right" | 59
| 101.909215(10)
| 5.28(15) s
| β−
| 102Ru
| 1+
|
|-
| rowspan=2 style="text-indent:1em" | 102mTc
| rowspan=2 colspan="3" style="text-indent:2em" | 20(10) keV
| rowspan=2|4.35(7) min
| β− (98%)
| 102Ru
| rowspan=2|(4, 5)
| rowspan=2|
|-
| IT (2%)
| 102Tc
|-
| 103Tc
| style="text-align:right" | 43
| style="text-align:right" | 60
| 102.909181(11)
| 54.2(8) s
| β−
| 103Ru
| 5/2+
|
|-
| 104Tc
| style="text-align:right" | 43
| style="text-align:right" | 61
| 103.91145(5)
| 18.3(3) min
| β−
| 104Ru
| (3+)#
|
|-
| style="text-indent:1em" | 104m1Tc
| colspan="3" style="text-indent:2em" | 69.7(2) keV
| 3.5(3) µs
|
|
| 2(+)
|
|-
| style="text-indent:1em" | 104m2Tc
| colspan="3" style="text-indent:2em" | 106.1(3) keV
| 0.40(2) µs
|
|
| (+)
|
|-
| 105Tc
| style="text-align:right" | 43
| style="text-align:right" | 62
| 104.91166(6)
| 7.6(1) min
| β−
| 105Ru
| (3/2−)
|
|-
| 106Tc
| style="text-align:right" | 43
| style="text-align:right" | 63
| 105.914358(14)
| 35.6(6) s
| β−
| 106Ru
| (1, 2)
|
|-
| 107Tc
| style="text-align:right" | 43
| style="text-align:right" | 64
| 106.91508(16)
| 21.2(2) s
| β−
| 107Ru
| (3/2−)
|
|-
| style="text-indent:1em" | 107mTc
| colspan="3" style="text-indent:2em" | 65.7(10) keV
| 184(3) ns
|
|
| (5/2−)
|
|-
| 108Tc
| style="text-align:right" | 43
| style="text-align:right" | 65
| 107.91846(14)
| 5.17(7) s
| β−
| 108Ru
| (2)+
|
|-
| rowspan=2|109Tc
| rowspan=2 style="text-align:right" | 43
| rowspan=2 style="text-align:right" | 66
| rowspan=2|108.91998(10)
| rowspan=2|860(40) ms
| β− (99.92%)
| 109Ru
| rowspan=2|3/2−#
| rowspan=2|
|-
| β−, n (.08%)
| 108Ru
|-
| rowspan=2|110Tc
| rowspan=2 style="text-align:right" | 43
| rowspan=2 style="text-align:right" | 67
| rowspan=2|109.92382(8)
| rowspan=2|0.92(3) s
| β− (99.96%)
| 110Ru
| rowspan=2|(2+)
| rowspan=2|
|-
| β−, n (.04%)
| 109Ru
|-
| rowspan=2|111Tc
| rowspan=2 style="text-align:right" | 43
| rowspan=2 style="text-align:right" | 68
| rowspan=2|110.92569(12)
| rowspan=2|290(20) ms
| β− (99.15%)
| 111Ru
| rowspan=2|3/2−#
| rowspan=2|
|-
| β−, n (.85%)
| 110Ru
|-
| rowspan=2|112Tc
| rowspan=2 style="text-align:right" | 43
| rowspan=2 style="text-align:right" | 69
| rowspan=2|111.92915(13)
| rowspan=2|290(20) ms
| β− (97.4%)
| 112Ru
| rowspan=2|2+#
| rowspan=2|
|-
| β−, n (2.6%)
| 111Ru
|-
| 113Tc
| style="text-align:right" | 43
| style="text-align:right" | 70
| 112.93159(32)#
| 170(20) ms
| β−
| 113Ru
| 3/2−#
|
|-
| 114Tc
| style="text-align:right" | 43
| style="text-align:right" | 71
| 113.93588(64)#
| 150(30) ms
| β−
| 114Ru
| 2+#
|
|-
| 115Tc
| style="text-align:right" | 43
| style="text-align:right" | 72
| 114.93869(75)#
| 100# ms [>300 ns]
| β−
| 115Ru
| 3/2−#
|
|-
| 116Tc
| style="text-align:right" | 43
| style="text-align:right" | 73
| 115.94337(75)#
| 90# ms [>300 ns]
|
|
| 2+#
|
|-
| 117Tc
| style="text-align:right" | 43
| style="text-align:right" | 74
| 116.94648(75)#
| 40# ms [>300 ns]
|
|
| 3/2−#
|
|-
| 118Tc
| style="text-align:right" | 43
| style="text-align:right" | 75
| 117.95148(97)#
| 30# ms [>300 ns]
|
|
| 2+#
|

Stability of technetium isotopes
Technetium and promethium are unusual light elements in that they have no stable isotopes. Using the liquid drop model for atomic nuclei, one can derive a semiempirical formula for the binding energy of a nucleus. This formula predicts a "valley of beta stability" along which nuclides do not undergo beta decay. Nuclides that lie "up the walls" of the valley tend to decay by beta decay towards the center (by emitting an electron, emitting a positron, or capturing an electron). For a fixed number of nucleons A, the binding energies lie on one or more parabolas, with the most stable nuclide at the bottom. One can have more than one parabola because isotopes with an even number of protons and an even number of neutrons are more stable than isotopes with an odd number of neutrons and an odd number of protons. A single beta decay then transforms one into the other. When there is only one parabola, there can be only one stable isotope lying on that parabola. When there are two parabolas, that is, when the number of nucleons is even, it can happen (rarely) that there is a stable nucleus with an odd number of neutrons and an odd number of protons (although this happens only in four instances: 2H, 6Li, 10B, and 14N). However, if this happens, there can be no stable isotope with an even number of neutrons and an even number of protons. (see Beta-decay stable isobars)

For technetium (Z = 43), the valley of beta stability is centered at around 98 nucleons. However, for every number of nucleons from 94 to 102, there is already at least one stable nuclide of either molybdenum (Z = 42) or ruthenium (Z = 44), and the Mattauch isobar rule states that two adjacent isobars cannot both be stable. For the isotopes with odd numbers of nucleons, this immediately rules out a stable isotope of technetium, since there can be only one stable nuclide with a fixed odd number of nucleons. For the isotopes with an even number of nucleons, since technetium has an odd number of protons, any isotope must also have an odd number of neutrons. In such a case, the presence of a stable nuclide having the same number of nucleons and an even number of protons rules out the possibility of a stable nucleus.

References

Isotope masses from:

Isotopic compositions and standard atomic masses from:

Half-life, spin, and isomer data selected from.

 
Technetium
Technetium